Betty Moore may refer to:

 Betty R. Moore (born 1934), Australian athlete who ran for Great Britain
 Betty Moore (diver) (born 1929), New Zealand diver